The Icelandic Literary Prize (Icelandic: Íslensku bókmenntaverðlaunin), or Icelandic Literary Award, is an award which is given to three books each year by the Icelandic Publishers Association. The prize was founded on the association's centennial in 1989. One award is for fiction or poetry, one for children's books and one for academic and non-fiction works. Five books are nominated in each category, and the year's nominations are publicized in the beginning of December, but the prize itself is not awarded until January. Because the year's nominations come in the middle of the Christmas book flood, these books receive a great deal of marketing. Once the books have been nominated, the Icelandic Publishers Association appoints a selection committee which chooses the winners.

List of winners of the Icelandic Literary Prize for fiction

List of winners of the Icelandic Literary Prize for children's books

List of winners of the Icelandic Literary Prize for academic works

See also 
 Icelandic literature
 Nordic Council's Literature Prize

References

External links 
 List of nominees and winners, Icelandic Booksellers Association 

Icelandic literary awards
Awards established in 1989
Fiction awards
Non-fiction literary awards